Hugh Lawrence Fletcher Moulton MC (1 April 1876 – 4 January 1962) was a British Liberal politician.

The son of John Fletcher Moulton, Baron Moulton, he was a barrister by profession. At the 1923 general election, he was elected as Member of Parliament (MP) for Salisbury in Wiltshire, but was defeated at the 1924 election. He did not stand for Parliament again.

References

External links 
 

1876 births
1962 deaths
Liberal Party (UK) MPs for English constituencies
UK MPs 1923–1924